Mizan is a concept in Quran, which has been described as "the principle of the middle path" and "the overarching divine principle for organizing our universe". Azizah Y. al-Hibri argues that Mizan, as the "divine scale", could be transformed into Adl in human realm.

See also 

 Moderation in Islam

References 

Islamic terminology
Arabic words and phrases